White Lighter is the third studio album by American indie rock band Typhoon. It was released in August 2013 and was their first studio album after the band signed with Roll Call Records.

Background

Typhoon front-man, Kyle Morton, wrote and composed all the songs on the album.  As a child, Morton had a life threatening case of Lyme disease and suffered multiple organ failures.  Ultimately he received a kidney transplant from his father, but he lost most of his childhood to the illness. The album is a mixture of darkness hopelessness along with wanting for more and uplifting melodies. At a concert in Boston, Morton shared the story behind the song named after a dilemma that shares his name, Morton's fork, which Morton explained as being "paralyzed by two equally bad choices," a situation he faced in his own past.

Reception

White Lighter was received with critical success. In regards to the band's sound and size, Hilary Saunders of Paste Magazine said "The band’s comparatively enormous size—marked by a horn section, string section and eclectic percussion—naturally exudes a boisterous optimism and familial charm." Jonathan Doyle of the New Welsh Review said that for Morton, "For him, this fear is not vanity in the face of impermanence but rather an attempt to make sense of time we have had and still have."

Track listing

Release history

Credits

Personnel

 Kyle Morton – lead vocals, piano, guitar
 Toby Tanabe – bass, vocals
 Dave Hall – guitar, vocals
 Shannon Steele – violin, vocals
 Jen Hufnagel – violin, vocals
 Pieter Hilton – drums, vocals
 Alex Fitch – drums, vocals
 Tyler Ferrin – horns, guitar, piano, vocals
 Ryan McAlpin – trumpet, vocals
 Eric Stipe – trumpet, vocals
 Devin Gallagher – percussion, ukulele, vocals

Production
 Recorded at Pendarvis Farm- Clackamas County, Oregon
 Mixed by Jeff Stuart Saltzman
 Mastering by Dave McNair
 Artwork by Rick Delucco
 Design by Toby Tanabe

References

2013 albums
Typhoon (American band) albums